"Behold, Eck!" is an episode of the original The Outer Limits television show. It first aired on 3 October 1964, during the second season.

Introduction

A creature called Eck who lives in a two-dimensional world finds himself transported to our three-dimensional world and seeks to return home with the help of special glasses made by an eccentric optical engineer.

Opening narration
"Since the first living thing gazed upward through the darkness, Man has seldom been content merely to be born, to endure, and to die. With a curious fervor he has struggled to unlock the mysteries of creation and of the world in which he lives. Sometimes he has won. Sometimes he has lost. And sometimes, in the tumbling torrents of space and time, he has brief glimpses of a world he never even dreams..."

Plot

Dr. Robert Stone, an absent-minded optic engineer, is a brilliant researcher in a field that few appreciate. His brother, a prominent government physicist, refuses to take him seriously and has essentially shut Dr. Stone out of his life. Dr. Stone's attractive secretary, Ms. Elizabeth Dunn, is in love with him and has read all of his recondite scientific papers, but Stone is blind to her feelings and myopically perceives only the details of his science.

The story begins as policemen investigate the destruction of Dr. Stone's office, the latest in a series of attacks on optometric facilities. After they leave, Dr. Stone realizes that his own glasses are broken and decides to try a pair of prescription lenses designed for patients who suffer from double vision, lenses made from meteoric quartz. Putting on the glasses, he recoils in horror as he sees a creature that appears to be made of energy. The creature attacks him, smashing his glasses, steals a page from Stone's notebook on which are written the names of patients who have been prescribed the lenses, and quickly vanishes.

Stone ascertains that the creature must exist in only two dimensions, as when he turns sideways he becomes invisible, and is able to move through walls. Stone visits his physicist brother to talk over the idea, but his brother dismisses him as mad. Dr. Stone has his secretary order several new pairs of the meteoric eyepieces, and tries to track down the patients sought by the two-dimensional creature. One has been injured, another is found dead, and the third, a welder, managed to ward off the creature with his welding torch (later Stone is told by the creature that in the second dimension, fire is all-powerful because two-dimensional organisms, like dry leaves or paper, are easily set aflame). It is also discovered that a large building has been cut in half. Stone's brother and the police begin to investigate these occurrences. Meanwhile, in the excitement of the moment, Stone suddenly seems to notice the love-struck Ms. Dunn for the first time, remarking after putting on a different pair of glasses that something about her "looks different," as she glows with adoration towards him.

Soon, the creature appears again to Stone after he puts on a pair of the meteoric glasses. The creature, the titular Eck, explains that he was trapped in our dimensional plane when he fell through an experimental portal. He needs to return to the second dimension through the rift and close it, or else the rift could cause all kinds of things from his dimension to spill through. Eck is unable to see properly in three-dimensional space, and requires lenses to correct his two-dimensional vision so that he can find the rift. Eck gives Stone one of his eyes, a translucent triangle shaped object, though he asserts that a lens must be constructed in 24 hours as he is dying. Stone begins to grind the interdimensional lens.  Meanwhile, Eck watches a TV broadcast about himself.  Thinking the broadcaster is also two-dimensional, he jumps into the TV set to seek help.  This causes him to become luminous, and thereafter can be seen without the special glasses.

The now-visible Eck wreaks more havoc in the city, then returns to Dr. Stone's office.  The police and Stone's brother have determined that Stone is harboring the creature, and break into his office with a flamethrower. They attack Eck with fire, and apparently kill him. After they leave, Dr. Stone and Elizabeth find Eck alive, having deceived his attackers. They produce the interdimensional lens, which Eck tries to take with him through a wall but cannot as the lens is three-dimensional. Stone and Elizabeth offer to bring the lens with them to the public square, where the rift is located. Eck exits through the wall, Stone asks Elizabeth if she would like to go to the square to "say goodbye to a friend," and the two exit as a couple, Stone's arm still around Elizabeth's waist.

Closing narration
"Paradoxically, Man's endless search for knowledge has often plundered his courage and warped his vision, so that he has faced the unknown with terror rather than awe, and probed the darkness with a scream rather than a light. Yet there have always been men who have touched the texture of tomorrow with understanding and courage. Through these men, we may yet touch the stars."

Background

The idea of a two dimensional world was lifted from the 1884 novella Flatland: A Romance of Many Dimensions by Edwin Abbott.  Writer William Cox wove a lighthearted comedy treatment around the two dimensional concept called "The Reluctant Monster" (this had no relation to Flatland other than the idea of a 2-D world). It was then passed to John Mantley, later the producer of western TV series Gunsmoke (from 1965-1967/Exec.Prod:1968-1975), to write the final teleplay. (source - The Outer Limits:The Official Companion (1986), page 305.)

Cast

External links

The Outer Limits (1963 TV series season 2) episodes
1964 American television episodes